Burlöv Municipality (Burlövs kommun) is a municipality in Skåne County in South Sweden in southern Sweden, just north of Malmö. Its seat is located in Arlöv, a community which for geographical and statistical purposes is seen as a part of Malmö (Malmö tätort).

The municipality is one of only a few in Sweden, and the only one in Scania, which still contains only the original municipal entity created from the old parish in 1863 (cf history of municipalities in Sweden) and has not been amalgamated. It is the second smallest municipality by area in the whole country (after Sundbyberg Municipality).

Geography
The municipality has no forests, lakes, or streams, but has an abundance of high-voltage power grids, highways and railroads, as it is on the main line from Malmö to northern Sweden. Like the rest of Scania, much land is used for agriculture and there are several old farms, mills and other sights from the last centuries in the vicinity.

Urban areas
There are three urban areas (also called a tätort or locality) in Burlöv Municipality, including Arlöv, which statistically is a part of Malmö (*). Malmö is mostly located in Malmö Municipality but a part of it sprawls into Burlöv Municipality.

In the table they are listed according to the size of the population as of December 31, 2005. The municipal seat is in bold characters.

Arlöv is an early industrialized town dominated by multi-storey apartment buildings, with a working class character. Its largest industry is Arlöv Sugar Factory, to which large amounts of sugar beets are transported from all around Scania.

Burlöv Center is located in Arlöv. It is a large shopping mall in the region.

Åkarp and Burlövs egnahem consist of detached house districts. They have a suburban character from where people commute to commercial centres and work within the metropolitan area of southwestern Scania.

Demography

The population of Burlöv Municipality increased with almost 1,000 people between 1986 and 2003. The largest part of the population increase has been due to high birth rates. Moving rates have played a small part, and is rather equalled, where – as is normal in smaller communities – young people move out and families with children move in.

Culture and history
Arlöv is located in the vicinity of agricultural fields, where the Old Church of Burlöv can be found, in the Burlöv Village. One of the oldest churches in Scania, it has mostly remained the way it was built in the 12th century, with its oldest parts concreted out of sandstone.

The coat of arms depict a sugar beet which was the chief industry for a while (e.g. the large Arlöv's Sugar Factory), and a star that symbolizes the Hvilan folk high school which was among the first group of folk high schools that were established in 1868.

International relations
The municipality is twinned with:

  Anklam, Germany

References
Statistics Sweden

External links

Coat of arms
Hvilan Folk High School In Swedish only.

Municipalities of Skåne County
Municipalities in the Øresund Region